Sripurusha was a Western Ganga Dynasty king who ruled from 726 - 788 CE. According to the Javali inscription Sripurusha ruled for 62 years. He had marital relations with the Badami Chalukyas and used titles such as Muttarasa, Rajakesari, Bhimakopa and Ranabhajana. An able warrior and a scholar, he authored the Sanskrit work Gajasastra. He is known to have undertaken significant irrigation projects such as the construction of a dam (Katta).

Politics of the South
The rule of Sripurusha Muttarasa seems to have been filled with conflicts with the Pallavas of Kanchi, Pandyas, later the Rashtrakutas who overthrew the Vatapi Chalukyas. The victory of Sripurusha over the Pallava Paramesvaravarman II and assumed the title Permanadi. He had good relations with Chalukyas and had helped them fight the Pallavas during the rule of Vikramaditya II and later he fought the Pandyas during the rule of Chalukya Kirtivarman II but suffered reversal at Venbai.
When the Rashtrakutas rose to power, though betrayed by the Nolambas, Sripurusha had many victories against Krishna I and occupied some Ratta territories. This resistance to Rashtrakutas continued for some time before the Gangas normalised their relationship with martial alliances.

References
Notes

Sources
 Dr. Suryanath U. Kamat, Concise history of Karnataka, 2001, MCC, Bangalore (Reprint 2002)

External links
 History of Karnataka by Dr.Arthikaje
 History of Ganga Dynasty - Dr. Jyotsna Kamat

8th-century Indian monarchs
History of Karnataka